"Just Feel Better" was the second international single to be released from Santana's 2005 album All That I Am. The song features lead vocals by Aerosmith frontman Steven Tyler, also signed to Sony Music Entertainment. The song is produced by John Shanks and written by Jamie Houston, Buck Johnson and Damon Johnson. The single achieved reasonable success in Australia, debuting at Number 8 on the ARIA chart and receiving significant airplay. In Australia it has been on Rage (ABC) and videohits (channel 10) a number of times.

The song was also recorded with Puddle of Mudd frontman Wes Scantlin on vocals but Santana said he felt Tyler did it better, with more emotion, although he liked both renditions. In 2010, Damon Johnson recorded his own version of the song for his album Release.

This song is shown to be playing on the first generation iPod Nano on its packaging box.

Music video
The music video stars Nikki Reed as a girl with various troubles, including a teacher who makes sexual advances towards her and a strained relationship with her mother. At the end, she finally meets a nice guy but who is suddenly killed in an accident, which drives her to make amends with her mother and work harder in school.

Awards and nominations

APRA Awards
The APRA Awards are presented annually from 1982 by the Australasian Performing Right Association (APRA).

|-
| 2007 || "Feel Better" (Burleigh Johnson, Damon Johnson, James Scoggin) – Santana featuring Steven Tyler || Most Performed Foreign Work ||

References

2005 singles
APRA Award winners
Music videos directed by Dave Meyers (director)
Santana (band) songs
Songs written by Jamie Houston (songwriter)
Songs written by Damon Johnson
2005 songs